Chen Dingchang (January 1937 – 7 September 2020) was a Chinese scientist specializing in aerospace engineering.

Biography
Chen was born in Shanghai, in January 1937, while his ancestral home was in Zhenjiang, Jiangsu. After graduating from Tsinghua University in 1963, he was assigned to the Second Branch of the Fifth Academy of Defense and later worked at the China Aerospace Science and Industry Corporation. He died of illness in Beijing, on September 7, 2020.

Contribution
Chen developed China's first laser radar.

Honours and awards
 2009 Member of the Chinese Academy of Sciences (CAS)

References

1937 births
2020 deaths
Scientists from Shanghai
Tsinghua University alumni
Members of the Chinese Academy of Sciences